Jacob Roger "Brick" Fleagle (22 August 1906 – 15 April 1992) was a jazz guitarist. He performed with leading musicians including Miles Davis. At one time Fleagle had his own sixteen-piece band.

References

1906 births
1992 deaths
20th-century guitarists